Nikhil Baran Sengupta (13 December 1943 – 18 February 2014) was a Hindi, Bengali, and Oriya art director, actor, painter and production designer. He made his debut as an art-director with "Gapa hele be Sata" (1975). His contribution to the success of films such as Janani (1984), Sahari Bagha (1985), Maa O Mamata, Suna Chadhei (1987), Jugantar, Tahader Katha, Bagh Bahadur (1989) and Mr. and Mrs. Iyer (2002) had always been acknowledged but less talked about.

In his 40 years of career span in the film industry, he was instrumental in encouraging young talents from Orissa to take center stage. In 1994, he was awarded as the Best Art Director for "Janani" and in 2009, he was awarded the Guru Kelu Charan award in the lifetime achievement category.

Early life
Sengupta grew up in Cuttack, the former capital and the largest city of the state of Odisha, India. He did his early schooling at the Ranihat Schooil in Cuttack, and later went to the Ravenshaw University, but his heart was with the world of art, which took him to Kolkata to study art at the Government College of Art & Craft.

Upon completion of his studies in 1969, he worked with a number of advertising firms, as a visualiser and as an illustrator for several magazines. He delved into painting and had a few exhibitions of his works. However, once he got into the film industry, he did not have any time to look back.

Career
A pioneer for the Oriya film industry, Nikhil da has the enviable distinction of working for more than 100 films in three languages – Oriya, Bengali and Hindi – and with 35 directors. He is lone member of the Oriya film industry to work with stalwarts like Aparna Sen, Buddhadeb Dasgupta, Manmohan Desai, Amol Palekar, Prasant Nanda, Biplab Roy Choudhury, Nitai Palit, Govind Tej and Raju Mishra.

Winner of three State Awards for art direction – Hakim Baboo, Janani and Hisab Nikas – his distinct debut came with Oriya film industry's first color film Gapa Helebi Sata.
The jury of Guru Kelucharan Mohapatra Award in recognition of his services and eminence has great pleasure in nominating Shri Nikhil Baran Sengupta for the award in the category of “ Eminent Person" in Cinema for the year 2008.

Personal life
Nikhil Da was married to Bijoya Sengupta. They had two sons- Neel Sengupta and Biman Sengupta. Whenever he had time from his shoots, Nikhil da loved to paint with water colours at his leisure. He died 18 February 2014 aged 70.

Filmography

Art director 

 Tora mora katha heba chup chap (2011)
 Ae Milana Juga Jugara (2010)
 Aaynate (2008)
 Pari Mahal (2003)
 Mr. and Mrs. Iyer (2002)
 House of Memories (2000)
 Nirbachana (1994)
 Suna Bhauja (1994)
 Bastra Haran (1991)
 Chakadola Karuchi Leela (1990)
 Maa Mate Shakti De (1990)
 Asuchi Mo Kalia Suna (1989)
 Bagh Bahadur (1989)
 Bidhira Bidhan (1989)
 Pua Moro Kala Thakura (1988)
 Chaka Aakhi Sabu Dekhuchi (1987)
 Suna Chadhei (1987)
 Tunda Baida (1987)
 Sahari Bagha (1985)
 Chaka Bhaunri (1985)
 Hakim Babu (1985)
 Jaga Hatare Pagha (1985)
 Samay Bada Balwan (1985)
 Janani (1984)
 Hisab Nikas (1982)
 Naiyya (1979)
 Balidan (1978)
 Galpa Helebi Sata (1976)
 Shesha Shrabana (1976)

Actor 
 Pari Mahal (2003)
 The Square Circle (1996)
 Nirbachan (1994)
 Asuchi Mo Kalia Suna (1989)

Production designer 

 Yugant (1995)
 Shivalika (2013)

References

External links
 
 Shri Nikhil Baran Sengupta at Srjan
 

1943 births
2014 deaths
Government College of Art & Craft alumni
University of Calcutta alumni
Indian production designers
People from Cuttack
Indian art directors
Cinema of Odisha
People from Chittagong
Bengali male artists
20th-century Indian designers
21st-century Indian designers
Artists from Odisha